Bonita Williams was a British West-Indian Communist Party leader, poet, and civil rights activist in Harlem, New York during the Great Depression in the 1930s. During this time, she wrote several poems and gave speeches focusing on black suffrage and workers’ rights in the context of racial discrimination and class inequity. In addition, Williams served as the leader of several Harlem-based organizations, namely the Harlem Unemployment Council, Harlem Tenants’ League, Harlem Action Committee against the High Cost of Living, and League of Struggle for Negro Rights (LSNR).

Williams was also a prominent communist in Harlem, serving as the Secretary of Organizing for the Harlem Communist Party and Executive Director of the United Tenants and Consumer’s Organization in the late 1940s. In her capacity, she served as a primary recruiter of Black men and women for the party, working to grow the number of African Americans identifying with the communist agenda during a time of increasing racial segregation.

Activism 
As a member of the Communist Party, Williams led a number of activist movements among other prominent Communist Party leaders. Prominent among them was her involvement in the Scottsboro Boys Trial alongside activist Audley Moore, a case involving nine young Black men wrongfully accused of raping two white women in Alabama. In solidarity with the Scottsboro Boys, Williams and Moore marched, wrote letters, and organized supporters in an effort to free these men from wrongful prosecution. It is said that this activism ultimately brought Williams to the Communist Party. 

Another instance of Williams’ activism was in her capacity as an employee at the Works Progress Administration (WPA). There, Williams is credited with creating a union supporting women of color, specifically the Italian, Puerto Rican, and Black women at the WPA in the late 1930s. Similar to her involvement in civil rights at the WPA, Williams also organized a protest with Richard B. Moore against British forces for shooting striking Jamaican cane workers in the Harlem area.

Williams also led additional protests against those in Harlem that posed a threat to working class communities of color. For example, Williams led a protest against store owners in Harlem that inflated meat prices and refused to employ workers of color through the “Don’t Buy Where You Can’t Work” campaign. In one of her campaigns against increased prices during the Great Depression, Williams successfully lobbied Harlem butchers to lower inflated meat prices by 25%. Furthermore, as head of the Harlem Workers Alliance, Williams led coordinated efforts against evictions and decreased welfare allotments.

Involvement in the Communist Party 
Bonita Williams joined the Communist Party following her involvement in the Scottsboro Boys Trial with Audley Moore. Later in their friendship, Williams and Moore traveled to the Soviet Union and formed transnational alliances with Soviet Union through the experience. Based on their experience abroad, Williams and Moore remarked that the Soviets could serve as models for Black women’s liberation in the United States, a perspective they took back to Harlem and their continued activism as communists.

In addition to her activism and leadership roles within the party, Williams was actively criticized by the United States government in Congressional testimony given by Walter S. Steele to the House Committee on Un-American Activities. In his testimony, Steele confirmed Williams as a prominent member of the Communist Party in New York State and did the same for hundreds of other communists across the country.

Poetry and oration 
In Harlem, Bonita Williams was often published and cited in the Harlem Liberator, an African American newspaper during the Great Depression era and early 1900s. Specifically, her poems and remarks on class inequality, racial discrimination, and labor rights are featured.

One of her poems, “Fifteen Million Negroes Speak”, was published in the October 14, 1933 issue of the Harlem Liberator, urging poor Blacks to demand a national Bill of Civil Rights from the U.S. government. An excerpt from the poem reads: “We must demand of the government Negro masses’ democratic rights”, a line emblematic of Williams’ focus on civil rights for Black Americans in Harlem.

Little is known about Williams’ other poems, though her oration and poetry was well-regarded during the time, especially among poor African Americans hoping to achieve class mobility.

References

Year of birth missing
Year of death missing
Members of the Communist Party USA
African-American communists